Tudhaliya is the name of several Hittite kings. It is not clear how many kings bore that name, and numbering schemes vary from source to source.

Tudhaliya (also Tudhaliya I) is a hypothetical pre-Empire king who would have reigned in the late 17th century BC (short chronology). Forlanini (1993) conjectures that this king corresponds to the great-grandfather of Hattusili I.
Tudhaliya I (also Tudhaliya I/II and Tudhaliya II), ruled c. 1430 to 1400 BC
Tudhaliya II (also Tudhaliya III), ruled c. in the 1380s BC
Tudhaliya III (also "Tudhaliya the child") may have briefly ruled around 1358 BC.
Tudhaliya IV ruled around 1237 BC.
Tudhaliya, Neo-Hittite king of Carchemish, fl. c. 1100 BC

In the Bible 
Some biblical scholars suggested that Tidal, king of Nations, who is mentioned in the Book of Genesis 14 as having joined Chedorlaomer in attacking rebels in Canaan is based on one of the Tudhaliyas.

See also

 History of the Hittites

Notes

Bibliography
Massimo Forlanini, Atti. del II Congresso Internazionale di Hittitologia, Pavia (1993)

External links
Reign of Tudhaliya

Hittite kings
Wikipedia disambiguation